Rukavishnikov (from рукавишник meaning mitten-maker) is a Russian masculine surname, its feminine counterpart is Rukavishnikova. It may refer to
Ivan Rukavishnikov (1877–1930), Russian writer
Ivan Rukavishnikov (gold miner) (1843–1901), Russian engineer and gold-miner
Nikolay Rukavishnikov (1932–2002), Soviet cosmonaut 
Olga Rukavishnikova (born 1955), Soviet pentathlete 
Roman Rukavishnikov (born 1992), Russian ice hockey defenceman
Yulian Rukavishnikov (1922–2000), Russian sculptor

Russian-language surnames